CMST may refer to:

Certified Master Safe Technician
Capacitated minimum spanning tree
Curtin University Centre for Marine Science and Technology